Inherent Vice is a 2014 American period neo-noir mystery comedy film written and directed by Paul Thomas Anderson, based on the 2009 novel of the same name by Thomas Pynchon. The cast includes Joaquin Phoenix, Josh Brolin, Owen Wilson, Katherine Waterston, Eric Roberts, Reese Witherspoon, Benicio del Toro, Jena Malone, Hong Chau, Joanna Newsom, Jeannie Berlin, Maya Rudolph, Michael K. Williams and Martin Short. The film follows Larry "Doc" Sportello, a well-intentioned but inept stoner, hippie, and private investigator in 1970, who is embroiled in the Los Angeles criminal underworld while investigating three cases interrelated by the disappearance of his ex-girlfriend and her new wealthy boyfriend.

Anderson's adaptation of Inherent Vice had been in development since 2010; it is the first Pynchon novel to be adapted for the screen. It is Anderson's second collaboration with Phoenix, following The Master, and involves a number of his other recurring collaborators, including producers Daniel Lupi and JoAnne Sellar, cinematographer Robert Elswit, editor Leslie Jones, and composer Jonny Greenwood.

Inherent Vice premiered at the New York Film Festival on October 4, 2014, and began a limited theatrical release in the United States on December 12, 2014. The film received generally positive reviews from critics, with many praising the performances, costumes and screenplay, but some criticizing the complicated plot. It was nominated for several awards, including two at the 87th Academy Awards and Best Actor – Motion Picture Musical or Comedy for Phoenix at the 72nd Golden Globe Awards. The National Board of Review named it one of the ten best films of the year. Some critics said that Inherent Vice has the makings of a cult film. In 2016, it was voted the 75th best film since 2000 in an international critics' poll.

Plot

In 1970, Shasta Fay Hepworth visits the beach house of her ex-boyfriend, Larry "Doc" Sportello, a private investigator and hippie in Gordita Beach, Los Angeles County. She tells him about her new lover, Michael Z. "Mickey" Wolfmann, a wealthy real estate developer, and asks him to help prevent Mickey's wife from abducting Mickey and committing him to an insane asylum.

Doc meets with Tariq Khalil, a member of the Black Guerrilla Family, who hires him to find Glen Charlock, a member of the Aryan Brotherhood he met in jail, who owes him money and is one of Wolfmann's bodyguards. He visits Mickey's Channel View Estates project, entering the only business in the developing strip mall, a massage parlor, where he meets an employee, Jade. He searches the premises for Charlock, but is hit with a baseball bat and collapses. Doc wakes outside, lying next to Charlock's dead body and surrounded by policemen. Interrogated by LAPD detective Christian F. "Bigfoot" Bjornsen, he learns that Wolfmann has disappeared. His attorney, Sauncho Smilax, arranges for his release by the LAPD.

Doc is hired by former heroin addict Hope Harlingen, who is looking for her missing husband, Coy. Although told that Coy is dead, she believes he is alive due to a large deposit to her bank account. Jade leaves Doc a message apologizing for setting him up with the police and telling him to "beware the Golden Fang." He meets her in an alley, where she explains the Golden Fang is an international drug smuggling operation. Jade introduces Doc to Coy, who tells him he is hiding at a house in Topanga Canyon. In a later meeting, he explains he is a police informant and fears for his life, wanting only to return to his wife and daughter. Doc talks to Sauncho, who tells him about the suspicious boat, the Golden Fang, which the last time it sailed, Shasta was on board. Thanks to a postcard from her, Doc finds a large building shaped like a golden fang and meets dentist Rudy Blatnoyd.

Bigfoot calls Doc and tells him that Blatnoyd has just been found dead with fang bites in his neck. Bigfoot decides to help Doc find Coy and tells him to search for Puck Beaverton in Chryskylodon, an asylum run by a cult connected to the Golden Fang. There, Doc finds Mickey, who is being watched by the FBI. Mickey tells him he felt guilty for the negativity his real-estate business caused and wants to give his money away, appearing to be a happy member of the cult. Doc also glimpses Puck and Coy. When Doc returns home to his beach house, he is greeted by Shasta, who has returned and is indifferent to the trouble her disappearance has caused. She tells him Mickey is back with his wife. Shasta confesses to having been on the Golden Fang with Mickey on a "three-hour tour" and says she was brought along to be used sexually by all of Mickey's friends. She brags about what she did on the boat to provoke Doc into rough sex, then tells him they still aren't back together.

Penny, an assistant district attorney with whom Doc is having a fling, gives him confidential files from which he learns that the LAPD pays the loan shark Adrian Prussia to kill people and that one of his victims was Bigfoot's former partner. Prussia is tied to the Golden Fang, and Doc learns that Charlock was involved with a deal, which is why he was killed. Doc visits Adrian, noticing his obsession with baseball bats, but is abducted and drugged by his partner, Puck. He manages to escape, killing both Puck and Adrian. Bigfoot appears and rescues him, driving him home, but Doc discovers he has been set up: Bigfoot has planted heroin in his car. Doc arranges for the drugs to be returned to the Golden Fang in exchange for Coy's freedom. Doc and Shasta drive off together, and he tells her this doesn't mean they are back together.

Cast

 Joaquin Phoenix as Larry "Doc" Sportello 
 Josh Brolin as Lieutenant Christian F. "Bigfoot" Bjornsen
 Owen Wilson as Coy Harlingen
 Katherine Waterston as Shasta Fay Hepworth
 Reese Witherspoon as Deputy District Attorney Penny Kimball
 Benicio del Toro as Sauncho Smilax, Esq.
 Jena Malone as Hope Harlingen
 Joanna Newsom as Sortilège, who is also the narrator
 Jordan Christian Hearn as Denis
 Hong Chau as Jade
 Jeannie Berlin as Aunt Reet
 Maya Rudolph as Petunia Leeway
 Michael Kenneth Williams as Tariq Khalil
 Michelle Sinclair as Clancy Charlock
 Martin Short as Dr. Rudy Blatnoyd, D.D.S.
 Sasha Pieterse as Japonica Fenway

 Martin Donovan as Crocker Fenway
 Eric Roberts as Michael Z. "Mickey" Wolfmann
 Jillian Bell as Chlorinda
 Serena Scott Thomas as Sloane Wolfmann
 Yvette Yates as Luz
 Andrew Simpson as Riggs Warbling
 Jefferson Mays as Dr. Threeply, Chryskylodon Institute
 Keith Jardine as Puck Beaverton
 Peter McRobbie as Adrian Prussia
 Sam Jaeger as FBI Agent Flatweed
 Timothy Simons as FBI Agent Borderline
 Samantha Lemole as Golden Fang Mother
 Madison Leisle as Golden Fang Daughter
 Matt Doyle as Golden Fang Father
 Liam Van Joosten as Golden Fang Son

Production

Development
It was first reported in December 2010 that Anderson wanted to adapt Inherent Vice; at the time, he had been writing a treatment and started on a script after The Master had been shelved indefinitely months prior. Anderson originally adapted the entire 384-page novel sentence by sentence which made it easier for him to cut down the script than the novel. By February 2011, Anderson had written a first draft and was more than halfway done with a second draft. The first draft was written without a narrator but the character of Sortilège was later turned into the voice of the narrator. In September 2012, Anderson stated that he was still writing the script but was hoping he could get Inherent Vice into production and have a few years of being more productive.

This is the first film adaptation from a Thomas Pynchon novel, with Anderson describing it "like a Cheech & Chong movie". Years prior, Anderson considered adapting Pynchon's 1990 novel Vineland, but could not figure out how. When Inherent Vice came out, he was drawn to it and wrote the film concurrently with The Master. Anderson significantly changed the ending from the novel and described the novel as "deeply written and beautifully profound stuff mixed in with just the best fart jokes and poop jokes that you can imagine." Anderson drew inspiration from Kiss Me Deadly, The Big Sleep, Raymond Chandler's The Long Goodbye, and Cheech & Chong's Up in Smoke. Anderson has said he tried to cram as many jokes onto the screen as Pynchon squeezed onto the page and that the visual gags and gimmicks were inspired by Zucker, Abrahams and Zucker-style slapstick spoofs like Police Squad!, Top Secret!, and Airplane!. Anderson also used the underground comic strip Fabulous Furry Freak Brothers as what he has described as an invaluable "research bible" for the writing process.

Casting
Robert Downey Jr. was reportedly interested in the role of Larry "Doc" Sportello and was making plans to start shooting in the fall of 2011 since he had dropped out of Oz the Great and Powerful. Downey Jr. stated in December 2011 that the planned collaboration was "probably true". In January 2013, it was reported that Joaquin Phoenix was in talks for the lead and that Downey Jr. had ultimately passed on the role. Downey Jr. later said that Anderson wanted to make the film with Phoenix because he was too old.

In May 2013, it was reported that Benicio del Toro, Owen Wilson, Reese Witherspoon, Martin Short, and Jena Malone were in talks to join the film. In May 2013, it was reported that Josh Brolin joined the cast and that Katherine Waterston joined as the lead female role. In June 2013, it was reported that Peter McRobbie and Sasha Pieterse joined the cast. In July 2013, it was reported that Timothy Simons joined the cast. In October 2013, it was reported that Michael K. Williams joined the cast.

In September 2014, it was reported that Pynchon may have a cameo in the film, which Anderson would not confirm, citing Pynchon's choice to stay out of the public spotlight. Brolin went as far as to confirm the cameo and claimed that Pynchon was on set but that nobody knew it was him as he stayed in the corner.

Filming
Principal photography began in May 2013, and it was reported that shooting was to take place until August 2, 2013. Shooting permits in California covered a San Fernando Valley warehouse, a storefront on Slauson Boulevard, driving shots in the Canoga Park area, driving shots in canyon roads above Malibu and a warehouse in Chinatown. In June 2013, filming also took place in Pasadena, and aboard the tall ship American Pride located in Long Beach.

The set has been described as organized chaos, but the cast felt protected when they took big risks. Short stated that "If you're working with a great director, you feel very, very, very safe because you know that all the decisions will be made months later in the editing room." Malone stated that "it was a very structured process" and that the "chaos can only come from a grounded, logical base because you have to know where you're going to be spinning from. The logic becomes the chaos and the chaos becomes the logic."

According to Waterston, Anderson did not have a clear goal while on set but it did not feel chaotic. Brolin said "It was crazy, chaotic but really, really gratifying." Brolin also stated that there was "a really strange lack of pretense" but that Anderson would work with the actors when they felt something was not working. Pieterse stated that Anderson allowed "freedom and flexibility to really dive into your character and shape the scene". Wilson said "Sometimes I wouldn't necessarily know what I was doing. We were encouraged to kind of do anything."

Soundtrack
The Inherent Vice soundtrack was composed by Radiohead guitarist Jonny Greenwood, recorded with the Royal Philharmonic Orchestra in London. It was Greenwood's third collaboration with Anderson, following There Will Be Blood and The Master.

The score includes a version of an unreleased Radiohead song, "Spooks", performed by Greenwood and members of Supergrass. Greenwood said Radiohead's version was "a half-idea we never made work live", describing it as a pastiche of the Pixies and surf music. The soundtrack also includes tracks from the late 1960s and early 1970s by Neil Young, Can, and the Marketts, among others. It was released by Nonesuch Records on December 16.

Release
Inherent Vice premiered as the centerpiece at the New York Film Festival on October 4, 2014. The film received a limited release on December 12, 2014, before being released in 645 theaters on January 9, 2015.

The film earned $8 million domestically and $6.6 million internationally, despite the positive reviews bringing its final gross to $14.6 million—around $6 million short of earning its budget back.

Reception
Inherent Vice was met with positive reviews. Critics praised the film for its performances, particularly those of Joaquin Phoenix, Josh Brolin and Katherine Waterston, while some were frustrated by its complicated plot. On Rotten Tomatoes, the film has an approval rating of 73% based on 251 reviews, with an average rating of 7.2/10. The website's critical consensus reads, "Inherent Vice may prove frustrating for viewers who demand absolute coherence, but it does justice to its acclaimed source material – and should satisfy fans of director P.T. Anderson." On Metacritic, the film has a weighted average score of 81 out of 100, based on 43 critics, indicating "universal acclaim".

Film Journal Internationals Ethan Alter commented that the film is "confounding, challenging and consistently unique." IGN reviewer Matt Patches gave the film an 8.9 out of 10 score, saying "There's nothing certain – a surprisingly rewarding sensation that demands repeat viewings. There's so much, too much, to soak up, and all the laughter Anderson piles on top of the thematics means there's plenty to miss. Inherent Vice is a high grain strain: Provocative, hilarious, and its own breed of weird." Collider's Adam Chitwood named it one of the top ten films of 2014.

The film was ranked 75th in a survey of 177 critics conducted by the BBC in 2016 to determine the 100 best films of the 21st century.

Top ten lists
Inherent Vice was listed on many film critics' top ten lists of 2014 films.

 1st: Drew McWeeny, HitFix
 1st: Glenn Kenny & Matt Zoller Seitz, RogerEbert.com
 1st: Ben Kenigsberg, The A.V. Club
 1st: Jordan Raup, The Film Stage
 2nd: RogerEbert.com
 2nd: J. Hoberman, Artforum
 2nd: Sasha Stone, Awards Daily
 2nd: Marlow Stern, The Daily Beast
 2nd: David Ehrlich, Little White Lies
 2nd: Mark Olsen, Los Angeles Times
 3rd: Keith Phipps, The Dissolve
 3rd: The Guardian
 3rd: Elizabeth Weitzman, New York Daily News
 3rd: Kristopher Tapley, HitFix
 3rd: Andrew O'Hehir, Salon
 4th: Scott Foundas, Variety
 5th: Wesley Morris, Grantland
 5th: Brian Tallerico, RogerEbert.com
 5th: Adam Chitwood, Collider
 5th: Gregory Ellwood, HitFix
 5th: Kimberly Jones, Austin Chronicle
 6th: Jake Coyle, Associated Press
 6th: Alison Willmore, BuzzFeed
 7th: Cahiers du Cinéma
 8th: Ty Burr, The Boston Globe
 9th: William Bibbiani, CraveOnline
 9th: Sight & Sound
 9th: David Ansen, The Village Voice
 9th: Betsy Sharkey, Los Angeles Times (tied with A Most Violent Year)
 10th: Eric Kohn, IndieWire
 10th: Harry Knowles, Ain't It Cool News
 10th: Joshua Rothkopf, Time Out New York
 Best of 2014 (listed alphabetically, not ranked): Manohla Dargis, The New York Times

Accolades

References

External links
 
 
 
 
 

2014 films
2010s English-language films
2010s crime comedy-drama films
2014 romantic comedy-drama films
American crime comedy-drama films
American romantic comedy-drama films
American films about cannabis
Dune Entertainment films
Films about adultery in the United States
Films about drugs
Films based on American novels
Films directed by Paul Thomas Anderson
Films scored by Jonny Greenwood
Films set in Los Angeles
Films set in 1969
Films set in 1970
Films shot in California
Films with screenplays by Paul Thomas Anderson
Hippie films
American police detective films
Stoner crime films
Thomas Pynchon
Warner Bros. films
American neo-noir films
2010s American films